Edgar Albert Sims (March 12, 1875 – September 20, 1945) was an American politician in the state of Washington. He served in the Washington House of Representatives and Washington State Senate.

References

Republican Party members of the Washington House of Representatives
1875 births
1945 deaths